Flights of Fancy: Defying Gravity by Design and Evolution  is a 2021 book written by Richard Dawkins and illustrated by Jana Lenzová.

Themes
Flights of Fancy talks about almost every aspect of flying–all the different ways of defying gravity–in imagination and in technology, in humans and in animals.  It ranges over many instances of flight including the Wright brothers, Greek mythology, extinct and living birds, helicopters, insects, bats, and flying squirrels.

Reception
 Alexander McCall Smith called it "A masterly investigation of all aspects of flight, human and animal... A beautifully produced book that will appeal across age groups"
 James McConnachie in The Times said, "Dawkins has always been an extraordinarily muscular, persuasive thinker. What feels new here is that he writes with such charm and warmth"

References

External links
 Richard Dawkins Interviewed on his Book Flights of Fancy [video]

2021 non-fiction books
Books by Richard Dawkins
Animal flight
Popular science books
Children's non-fiction books